State Route 119 is a state highway in Nevada, United States.  It connects U.S. Route 95 east to NAS Fallon as part of Berney Road.

Major intersections

References

119
Lincoln Highway
Transportation in Churchill County, Nevada